EVER Monaco is annual exhibition and conference event showcasing the latest renewable energy technology with a focus on vehicle design.  "EVER" is a (somewhat flawed) acronym for "ecologic vehicles and renewable energies."

The Venturi Fetish, the world’s first production two-seater electric sports car, became the sensation of the first EVER, held in 2005. The Fetish has a range of 250 to 350 km (155 to 217 miles) and boasts a 0–100 km/h (0–60 mph) time of 4.5 seconds.

The 2009 EVER took place in and around Monaco’s Grimaldi Forum, a 35,000-m² (377,000-sq. ft.) arena on the shores of the Mediterranean Sea, from 26 to 29 March.

See also
 Electric cars
 Electric vehicle conversion
 Battery electric vehicle
 Hybrid vehicle

External links
Official homepage of the EVER Monaco

Renewable energy organizations
Transport in Monaco